Barry Stern (born 27 September 1932) is an Australian-born gallerist and art dealer who had an early career as a theatre and art critic. He was formerly active in the Sydney art market but now lives in retirement in Bangkok. The Barry Stern Galleries in Glenmore Road, Paddington, New South Wales, is still owned by Stern but Maunsell Wickes Gallery now operates from that space.

Early life
Stern was born in Sydney to a Jewish family and was first educated at local schools. In 1948 and 1949 he attended Newington College.

Gallerist

Stern first started a gallery in 1958. In April 1959 he opened premises at 217A George Street, Sydney and named the space the Museum of Modern Art. It moved to Kings Cross later that year and then in 1962 to Paddington, where it was renamed the Barry Stern Galleries. Stern saw himself as a bridge between the artist and the buying public, representing the unfashionable artists of the time. In addition to the Glenmore Road gallery which held stock, Stern also had two galleries for exhibitions only, one in Mary Place, Paddington, and the other in Gordon and later Pymble. Stern retired in 1989 to live in Morocco and the running of the gallery was taken over by his assistant Dominic Maunsell. Maunsell now runs Maunsell Wickes gallery in the Glenmore Road space. Stern now lives in Bangkok. The early records of his gallery, including correspondence, framing invoices, financial records, exhibition catalogues, press clippings, photographs, and original drawings are held by the National Library of Australia.

Oral history
The National Library of Australia hold the 1986 recordings of interviews of Stern by Barbara Blackman, the former wife of artist Charles Blackman. In these oral histories he speaks about his Jewish family background, his childhood in Sydney, anti-semitism, World War II, working as a theatre and art critic, founding the Barry Stern Galleries, his involvement in the Poetry Society of New South Wales, the art scene in Sydney in 1960s, his work as a gallery owner and art dealer, numerous Australian painters, his private collection, art framing, and other Australian art collectors. The NLA hold another set of interviews undertaken by Ross Steele in 2009.

References 

1932 births
Living people
People from Sydney
People educated at Newington College
Australian art dealers
Australian gay men